Bambrough is a surname. Notable people with the surname include:

Laura Bambrough, the birth name of L'Wren Scott (1964–2014), American fashion designer, costume designer, and model
Renford Bambrough (1926–1999), British philosopher